Kilimanjaro National Park is a Tanzanian national park, located  south of the equator and in Kilimanjaro Region, Tanzania. The park is located near the region of Moshi. The park includes the whole of Mount Kilimanjaro above the tree line and the surrounding montane forest belt above . The park is administered by the Tanzania National Parks Authority (TANAPA). It was established as a national park in 1973.

The park generated US$51 million in revenue in 2013, the second-most of any Tanzanian national park, and was one of only two Tanzanian national parks to generate a surplus during the 2012-13 budget year. (The Ngorongoro Conservation Area, which includes the heavily visited Ngorongoro Crater, is not a national park.) TNPA has reported that the park recorded 58,460 tourists during the 2012-13 budget year, of whom 54,584 were foreigners. Of the park's 57,456 tourists during the 2011-12 budget year, 16,425 hiked the mountain, which was well below the capacity of 28,470 as specified in the park's General Management Plan.

History
In the early twentieth century, Mount Kilimanjaro and the adjacent forests were declared a game reserve by the German colonial government. In 1921, it was designated a forest reserve. In 1973, the mountain above the tree line (about ) was reclassified as a national park. The park was declared a World Heritage Site by the United Nations Educational, Scientific and Cultural Organization in 1987. In 2005, the park was expanded to include the entire montane forest, which had been part of the Kilimanjaro Forest Reserve.

Fauna
A variety of animals can be found in the park. Above the timberline, the Kilimanjaro tree hyrax, the grey duiker, and rodents are frequently encountered. The bushbuck and red duiker appear above the timberline in places. Cape buffaloes are found in the montane forest and occasionally in the moorland and grassland. Elephants can be found between the Namwai and Tarakia rivers and sometimes occur at higher elevations. In the montane forests, blue monkeys, eastern black and white colobuses, bushbabies, and leopards can be found.

See also
List of protected areas of Tanzania
Marangu
Chaga people

Gallery

References

External links 

 Explore Kilimanjaro National Park in the UNESCO collection on Google Arts and Culture

National parks of Tanzania
World Heritage Sites in Tanzania
Mount Kilimanjaro
Geography of Kilimanjaro Region
Protected areas established in 1973
1973 establishments in Tanzania
Tourist attractions in the Kilimanjaro Region